Respectable may refer to:

Having significant social status
"Respectable" (Rolling Stones song), 1978 single 
"Respectable" (Mel and Kim song), 1987 single 
"Respectable",  a 1960 single by The Isley Brothers, a 1965 album cover by the Yardbirds on Having a Rave Up with The Yardbirds, and a 1966 cover by The Outsiders
"Respectable", a song by Don McLean from the album Tapestry
Respectable (TV series), set in a brothel, broadcast by Five in the UK in 2006

See also
Respect (disambiguation)

ja:クリケット (曖昧さ回避)